Hitchcock Bay is a hamlet in the Canadian province of Saskatchewan.

Demographics 

References

Coteau No. 255, Saskatchewan
Designated places in Saskatchewan
Organized hamlets in Saskatchewan